The Cello Concerto is a composition for solo cello and orchestra by the Scottish composer James MacMillan.  It is the second of three interrelated compositions in MacMillan's Easter triptych Triduum commissioned by the London Symphony Orchestra.  The piece was first performed at the Barbican Centre on October 3, 1996 by the cellist Mstislav Rostropovich and the London Symphony Orchestra under the conductor Colin Davis.  The work is dedicated to Mstislav Rostropovich.

Composition
The Cello Concerto has a duration of roughly 41 minutes and is composed in three movements:
The Mockery 
The Reproaches
Dearest Wood and Dearest Iron

Instrumentation
The work is composed for solo cello and an orchestra comprising two flutes (2nd doubling piccolo), two oboes, two clarinets, (2nd doubling E-flat clarinet and bass clarinet), bassoon, contrabassoon, four horns, three trumpets, three trombones, tuba, timpani, three percussionists, piano (doubling celesta), harp, and strings.

Reception
Robert Cowan of The Independent wrote, "MacMillan's Concerto extends the 'dialogue of extremes' that has proved a pivotal aspect of his earlier work. It opens with a bang, and keeps the soloist busily employed virtually for the duration. It is, in a word, a 'real' Cello Concerto - lyrical, combative, rich in dialogue and scored with a skill that suggests innovative imagination and a marked respect for tradition."  BBC Music Magazine also praised the concerto, writing, "One may feel that some of the effects MacMillan uses – the overlaid screaming brass fanfares, the extensive use of percussion – are excessive, but they are contained within a tautly argued, tightly structured whole, and possessed of a thrillingly direct – and profoundly affecting – musicality. I defy anyone not to be moved by this music, whether for its considerable emotional impact or purely the artistry of its musical structures."  Arnold Whittall of Gramophone further opined:

See also
List of compositions by James MacMillan

References

Concertos by James MacMillan
1996 compositions
MacMillan
Music commissioned by the London Symphony Orchestra